A community land trust (CLT) is a nonprofit corporation that holds land on behalf of a place-based community, while serving as the long-term steward for affordable housing, community gardens, civic buildings, commercial spaces and other community assets on behalf of a community. CLTs balance the needs of individuals who want security of tenure in occupying and using land and housing, with the needs of the surrounding community, striving to secure a variety of social purposes such as maintaining the affordability of local housing, preventing the displacement of vulnerable residents, and promoting economic and racial inclusion. Across the world, there is enormous diversity among CLTs in the ways that real property is owned, used, and operated and the ways that the CLT itself is guided and governed by people living on and around a CLT’s land.

Historical overview 
The community land trust (CLT) is a model of affordable housing and community development that has slowly spread throughout the United States, Canada, Europe, and the United Kingdom over the past 50 years. More recently, CLTs have begun to appear in the Global South as well.

Community land trusts trace their conceptual history to England’s Garden Cities, India's Gramdan Movement, and Israel’s cooperative agricultural settlements, the moshavim.  As Robert Swann and his co-authors noted in The Community Land Trust: A New Model for Land Tenure in America (1972): "The ideas behind the community land trust...have historic roots" in the indigenous Americas, in pre-colonial Africa, and in ancient Chinese economic systems. Thus, "the goal is to 'restore' the land trust concept rather than initiate it."

The model was originated in the United States by Ralph Borsodi in the 1930s and later formalized and refined by Robert Swann, Simon Gottschalk, Erick S. Hansch, and Edward Webster in a seminal book published in 1972, entitled The Community Land Trust:  A Guide to a New Model for Land Tenure in America.  Borsodi, Swann, and their colleagues drew upon earlier examples of planned communities on leased land including the garden city movement in the United Kingdom, single tax communities inspired by Henry George in the USA, Gramdan villages in India, and moshav communities on lands owned by the Jewish National Fund in Israel. New Communities, Inc., the prototype for the modern-day community land trust, was formed in 1969 near Albany, Georgia, by local leaders of the Civil Rights Movement who were seeking a new way to achieve secure access to land for African American families.

According to the Schumacher Center for a New Economics website, "Swann was inspired by Ralph Borsodi and by Borsodi's work with J. P. Narayan and Vinoba Bhave, both disciples of Gandhi". Vinoba walked from village to village in rural India in the 1950s and 1960s, gathering people together and asking those with more land than they needed to give a portion of it to their poorer sisters and brothers. The initiative was known as the Bhoodan or Land gift movement, and many of India's leaders participated in these walks.

Some of the new landowners, however, became discouraged. Without tools to work the land and seeds to plant it, without an affordable credit system available to purchase these necessary things, the land was useless to them. They soon sold their deeds back to the large landowners and left for the cities. Seeing this, Vinoba altered the Boodan system to a Gramdan or Village gift system. All donated land was subsequently held by the village itself. The village would then lease the land to those capable of working it. The lease expired if the land was unused. The Gramdan movement inspired a series of regional village land trusts that anticipated Community Land Trusts in the United States.

The first organization to be labeled with the term 'community land trust' in the USA, called New Communities, Inc., was founded with the purpose of helping African-American farmers in the rural South to gain access to farmland, to work it cooperatively, and to have security in the single-family and multi-family housing they planned to build..

Precursors to this prototype for the modern CLT were the School of Living, founded by Ralph Borsodi in 1936, and the Celo Community in North Carolina, which was founded in 1938 by Arthur Ernest Morgan.

United States

New Communities 

Robert Swann worked with Slater King, president of the Albany Movement and a cousin of Martin Luther King Jr., Charles Sherrod, an organizer for the Student Nonviolent Coordinating Committee, his wife Shirley Sherrod, and individuals from the Federation of Southern Cooperatives and other civil rights organizations in the South to develop New Communities, Inc., "a nonprofit organization to hold land in perpetual trust for the permanent use of rural communities".

Their vision for New Communities Inc. drew heavily on the example and experience of the Jewish National Fund (JNF) in making land available through 99-year ground leases for the development of planned communities and agricultural cooperatives.  The JNF was founded in 1901 to buy and develop land in Ottoman Palestine (later Israel) for Jewish settlement.  By 2007, the JNF owned 13% of all the land in Israel.  It has a long and established legal history of leasing land to individuals, to cooperatives, and to intentional communities such as kibbutzim and moshavim. Swann, Slater King, Charles Sherrod, Faye Bennett, director of the National Sharecroppers Fund, and four other Southerners travelled to Israel in 1968 to learn more about ground leasing. They decided on a model that included individual leaseholds for homesteads and cooperative leases for farmland. New Communities Inc. purchased a  farm near Albany, Georgia in 1970, developed a plan for the land, and farmed it for 20 years.

The land was eventually lost as a result of USDA racial discrimination, but the example of New Communities inspired the formation of a dozen other rural community land trusts in the 1970s. It also inspired and informed the first book about community land trusts, produced by the International Independence Institute in 1972.  The story of New Communities Inc. was told in a documentary film, produced in 2016, Arc of Justice: The Rise, Fall, and Rebirth of a Beloved Community.

International Independence Institute
Ralph Borsodi, Robert Swann, and Erick Hansch founded the International Independence Institute in 1967 to provide training and technical assistance for rural development in the United States and other countries, drawing on the model of the Gramdan villages being developed in India. In 1972, Swann, Hansch, Shimon Gottschalk, and Ted Webster proposed a "new model for land tenure in America" in The Community Land Trust, the first book to name and describe this new approach to the ownership of land, housing, and other buildings. One year later, they changed the name of the International Independence Institute to the Institute for Community Economics (ICE).

In the 1980s, ICE began popularizing a new notion of the CLT, applying the model for the first time to problems of affordable housing, gentrification, displacement, and neighborhood revitalization in urban areas. From 1980–1990, Chuck Matthei, an activist with roots in the Catholic Worker movement and the peace movement, served as Executive Director of ICE, then based in Greenfield, MA. ICE pioneered the modern community land trust and community loan fund models.

The model spreads
Under Matthei's tenure, the number of community land trusts increased from a dozen to more than 100 groups in 23 states, creating many hundreds of permanently affordable housing units, as well as commercial and public service facilities. With colleagues Matthei guided the development of 25 regional loan funds and organized the National Association of Community Development Loan Funds, later known as the National Community Capital Association. From 1985–1990, Matthei served as a founding Chairman of the Association and from 1983–1988 he served as a founding board member of the Social Investment Forum, the national professional association in the field of socially responsible investment. Matthei and his colleagues at the Institute for Community Economics also launched an effort in the early to mid-1980s to address many of the legal and operational questions about CLTs that were arising as banks, public officials and by an ecumenical association of churches and ministries created to prevent the displacement of low-income, African-American residents from their neighborhood.

During the 1980s, the number of urban CLTs increased dramatically. The first urban CLT, the Community Land Cooperative of Cincinnati, was founded in 1981.  CLTs were sometimes formed, as in Cincinnati, in opposition to the plans and politics of municipal government. In other cities, like Burlington, Vermont and Syracuse, New York, community land trusts were formed in partnership with a local government. One of the most significant city-CLT partnerships was formed in 1989 when a CLT subsidiary of the  Dudley Street Neighborhood Initiative was granted the power of eminent domain by the City of Boston.

One of the earliest and most influential CLTs in the United States is the Burlington Community Land Trust (BCLT) in Vermont, which was founded in 1984 as an initiative of the municipal administration led by Mayor Bernie Sanders.  The BCLT was a response to rapidly increasing housing costs that threatened to price out many long term residents of the city. BCLT is now known as the Champlain Housing Trust (CHT). CHT owns the underlying land but residents of CHT own the house or unit in which they live. Residents of CHT pay no more than 30% of their income in rent or mortgage payments, and resale prices of units cannot increase more than a previously specified percentage so that future generations of low income and moderate income people can also afford to live in the development. Half of CHT's units are in Burlington, and half outside. CHT has provided a substantial increase in the Burlington area's affordable housing stock, with CHT units comprising 7.6% of total housing in Burlington.

Alternative names
In the United States, Community Land Trusts may also be referred to as:
 Affordable housing land trust
 Neighborhood Land Trust

United Kingdom 

In Scotland, the community land movement is well established and supported by government. Members of Community Land Scotland own or manage over 500,000 acres of land, home to over 25,000 people.

There are currently 255 CLTs in England and Wales, with over 17,000 members and 935 homes. The movement has grown rapidly since 2010, when pioneer CLTs and supporters established the National CLT Network for England and Wales. CLTs were defined in English law in section 79 of the Housing and Regeneration Act 2008.

CLTs in the UK share most of the defining features with CLTs in the United States. But they have tended to have a greater focus on the participation of their local members and community-level democracy, and are more likely to emerge as grassroots citizen initiatives. In Scotland they are also associated with communities reclaiming land from absentee aristocratic landowners.

Elsewhere 
Research into, or the creation of fledgling CLT movements, has been occurring in other countries, including in Europe (France and Belgium), on the African continent (Kenya), and in Oceania (Australia, New Zealand) and The Netherlands .

See also 
 Aboriginal land trust
 Community development financial institution
 Equity sharing
 Housing cooperative
 John Emmeus Davis
 Robert Swann (land trust pioneer)
 Ralph Borsodi

References

Further reading

Bibliography 

 A Community Land Trust Bibliography:  Selected and Compiled by John Emmeus Davis, 2020.

Books 
The Community Land Trust: A Guide to a New System of Land Tenure in America original 1972 book authored by Robert Swann et al. in pdf form
The Community Land Trust Handbook, authored by the Institute for Community Economics and published by Rodale Press in 1982.
Streets of Hope: The Fall and Rise of an Urban Neighborhood, authored by Peter Medoff and Holly Sklar and published by South End Press in 1994.
Starting a Community Land Trust: Organizational and Operational Choices, a 2007 publication authored by John Emmeus Davis.
The City-CLT Partnership: Municipal Support for Community Land Trusts, authored by John Emmeus Davis and Rick Jacobus and published by the Lincoln Institute of Land Policy in 2008.
The Community Land Trust Reader, edited by John Emmeus Davis and published by the Lincoln Institute of Land Policy in 2010.
Building sustainable communities from the grassroots: How community land trusts can create social sustainability by Nick Bailey. In T. Manzi, K. Lucas, T. Lloyd-Jones, and J. Allen (eds.) Understanding Social Sustainability, London: Earthscan, 49–64.2010.
Manuel d’antispeculation immobiliere.  Edited by John Emmeus Davis (Montreal: Les Editions Ecosociete, 2014).  
On Common Ground, International Perspectives on the Community Land Trust, a 2020 publication of twenty-six original essays tracing the international growth and diversification of the community land trust model.
La inseguridad de la tenencia de la tierra en América Latina y el Caribe: el control comunitario de la tierra como prevención del desplazamiento [A Common Ground Monograph]. Edited by John Emmeus Davis, Line Algoed, and Maria E. Hernandez-Torrales (Madison, WI: Terra Nostra Press, 2020.
Why Community Land Trusts? [A Common Ground Monograph]. Edited by John Emmeus Davis, Line Algoed, and Maria E. Hernandez-Torrales (Madison, WI: Terra Nostra Press, 2020[JD2] ).

Articles 
 Lasting Affordability in Housing Now: Our Path to Racial Equity, by Tony Pickett
 The Most We Can Do: A National Mandate for Housing Justice, by Tony Pickett
“We shall not be moved. Collective ownership gives power back to poor farmers, ” by Audrea Lim, Harper’s Magazine, 2020
 Community Land Trusts: An Introduction, by Tom Peterson
 "Burlington Busts the Affordable Housing Debate" Discussion of community land trust program in Burlington, VT
 Community Land Trusts: Protecting the Land Commons, by David Harper
Community Land Trusts in England, by Dave Smith

External links 
Center for Community Land Trust Innovation: preserving the past, exploring the future of the international CLT movement.
Grounded Solutions Network (USA) (a merger involving the National Community Land Trust Network and the Cornerstone Partnership)
National Community Land Trust Network (England and Wales)
CLT Resources Center, Burlington Associates in Community Development, LLC
New Economics Institute in the United States (formerly E. F. Schumacher Society) page with information on CLTs
Equity Trust, Inc. has promoted the use of community land trusts in preserving working farms and securing land for community supported agriculture.
Beer Community Land Trust established in 2013 to facilitate the development of affordable housing at 80% of the prevailing market prices for local people in the village of Beer, Devon, United Kingdom.
The Madison Area Community Land Trust is the developer and steward of Troy Gardens, a nationally recognized project that combines affordable housing, community gardens, and urban agriculture.
The San Francisco Community Land Trust
The Champlain Housing Trust, currently the largest community land trust in the United States, serving a three-county area in northwestern Vermont and managing a portfolio of over 2,000 units of affordable housing.
The Northwest Community Land Trust Coalition
CLT East, Professional advice and technical support in the East of England for community land trusts.
Proud Ground, the Northwest's largest community land trust, serving the Portland Metropolitan area
Minnesota Community Land Trust Coalition
The Northern California Land Trust, the oldest CLT in California
London Community Land Trust The first community land trust in London, organising communities to deliver affordable homes
School of Living Supports the development of community land trusts in the Mid-Atlantic region of the United States
Mount Alexander Community Land Limited (Australia)
Community Land Trust Brussels (Belgium)

Urban planning
Neighborhood associations
Community development organizations